Simon Lyndon (born 18 February 1971 in London) is an English-born Australian actor and director who grew up in Fremantle, Western Australia.  He is a WAAPA graduate.

Career

Film roles
Lyndon played Jimmy Loughlin in Chopper with Eric Bana, for which he won an AFI award for Best Supporting Actor and a Film Critics Circle of Australia Award for best supporting actor. He received AFI nominations for Best Supporting Actor for Blackrock (as Brett "Ricko" Ricketson) and Best actor in a telefeature or mini-series for his role in My Brother Jack.

Other films include Fresh Air, Sample People, The Thin Red Line, From the Outside Caught Inside, Falling into Paradise, The Glenmore Job The Well and Dust off the Wings He has appeared on stage That Eye the Sky, Blackrock, Cloudstreet and Popcorn.

Television roles
His TV appearances include Police Rescue, Heartbreak High, Wildside, Underbelly Canal Road and Spirited 2  [Foxtel]. He has directed Tamarama Rock Surfers production of "Road" featuring among others Bojana Novakovic, Jeremy Cumpston, Zena Cumpston and Angie Milliken and Tamarama Rock Surfers production of " Diary of a Madman" starring Alan Morris.
Simon also appeared in FOX network show Roar in 1997 as a tribe leader named Colm. The lead role of Connor Der Kilte was played by fellow Australian and Blackrock co-star Heath Ledger.

In 2011 he played a younger Jack Thompson in Paper Giants: The Birth of Cleo on ABC 1. He played the miner who died, Larry Knight, in the TV film Beaconsfield about the 2006 mine disaster. Also in 2011 Simon appeared in Spirited in the second series, on Foxtel, playing a ghost known as "The King" or Darren Bonney, who lives in an apartment with  a dentist Claudia Karvan who is in love with another ghost resident.

Simon played Tintagel Stone in “The Green Mill Murder”, S1:E3 of Miss Fisher's Murder Mysteries in 2012.  He also appeared in TV series Puberty Blues as a surfing teacher Gumby that year.  In 2013 he was in a four-person play called "Anaconda " by Sarah Doyle, with Tamarama Rock Surfers at Bondi Pavilion.

In June/July 2017 Simon appeared Sunset Strip, a four-person play by Suzie Miller, performed by Stables Theatre Company at Griffin Theatre in Darlinghurst.
He reprised this role in a tour around Australia  by  the same company in 2019.

He appeared as Emilio the truck business owner  in Mystery Road  TV Series 2 Episodes 1,2 and 3.
He Appeared as the unfortunate Hedwig’s father in the 2021 
Netflix series ‘Eden’ and as Twist in ‘Troppo’ the 2022 ABC tv series.

References

External links
 

Australian male film actors
People educated at John Curtin College of the Arts
People from Fremantle
1971 births
Living people
Male actors from Western Australia
Edith Cowan University alumni
English emigrants to Australia